Heteropsis may refer to:
Heteropsis (butterfly), a genus of butterflies in the family Nymphalidae
Heteropsis (plant), a genus of plants in the family Araceae
Histioteuthis heteropsis, a small squid species with two very differently-sized and purposed eyes.